Maurice Ourry (19 October 1776 – 19 February 1843) was a French poet, playwright and journalist.

Biography 
After his studies at the College of Juilly, he moved to Paris in 1794. His career was launched with his first vaudeville, La Danse interrompue, which obtained an important success. But the plays that followed, even if numerous, would not equal the success of the first.

An editor by the Journal des arts and the Journal de Paris of which he became chief editor, after the cessation of the newspaper, he founded the Nouveau journal de Paris, solely dedicated to the arts and literature. He also participated to the 'Encyclopédie des gens du monde and to the Dictionnaire de la conversation.

His plays were presented on the most important Parisian stages of the 19th century, including the Théâtre des Variétés, the Théâtre du Vaudeville, and the Théâtre de la Gaîté.

Works 

 La danse interrompue, vaudeville in 1 act, with Pierre-Yves Barré, 1795
 La Ligue des femmes ou le Roman de la rose, comédie anecdotique in 1 act, in prose mingled with vaudevilles, with de Chazet, 1807
 Le Loup-garou, comedy in 1 act and in prose, mingled with couplets, with Francis baron d'Allarde, 1807
 Quitte à quitte, ou les Jeunes vieillards, comedy in 1 act and in prose, mingled with vaudevilles, 1807
 Les Amours de Braillard, ou Tout le monde en veut, imitation burlesque des Amours de Bayard by Monvel, in 1 act, in prose, mingled with couplets, 1808
 Le Mari juge et partie, comédy in 1 act and in verses, with de Chazet, 1808
 Monsieur Asinard ou Le volcan de Montmartre, 1809
 M. Asinard ou Le Volcan de Montmartre, folie in 1 act, mingled with couplets, with de Chazet, 1809
 Le fils par hasard, ou Ruse et folie, comedy in 5 acts, in prose, with de Chazet, 1809
 Le Jardin, turc, folie in 1 act, mingled with couplets, 1809
 Les baladines, imitation burlesque des Bayadères by Jouy, folie in 1 act, in prose, mingled with couplets, 1810
 Le mai d'amour ou Le rival complaisant, 1810
 Les commissionnaires, 1-act comedy, 1810
 Prologue des Ruines de Rome , 1810
 Le Mai d'amour, ou le Rival complaisant, comedy in 1 act and in prose, mingled with couplets, with de Chazet, 1810
 Les Époux de trois jours, ou J'enlève ma femme, 2-act comedy in prose, mingled with vaudevilles, with Commagny, 1810
 L'Acteur dans sa loge, prologue à travestissements, mingled with couplets, with François-Marie Mayeur de Saint-Paul, 1810
 Mahomet Barbe-bleue, imitation burlesque de Mahomet II, one-act play in prose, mingled with couplets, with Jean-Toussaint Merle, 1811
 Prologue d'Arlequin cendrillon, 1811
 Les Sabines de Limoges, ou l'Enlèvement singulier, vaudeville héroïque in 1 act, with Philibert Rozet and Henri Simon, 1811
 L'Enfant prodigue, ou le Panier percé, folie in 1 act, mingled with couplets, 1811
 Les Hommes femmes, folie in 1 act mingled with couplets, with de Chazet, 1811
 Irons-nous à Paris ? ou Revue de l'an 1810, vaudeville in 1 act, with Merle, 1811
 Ode sur la naissance du roi de Rome, 1811
 Saphirine, ou le Réveil magique, mélo-féerie in 2 acts extravaganza, preceded by the Livre du destin, prologue, with Merle, 1811
 Une journée de garnison, comedy in 1 act, mingled with couplets, with Merle, 1812
 Paris volant, ou la Fabrique d'ailes, folie-épisodique in 1 act in prose and vaudevilles, with Théaulon, 1812
 Crispin financier, comedy in 1 act, with Merle, 1812
 La Chevalière d'Éon, ou les Parieurs anglais, comedy in 1 act, in prose, mingled with vaudeville, with Commagny, 1812
 L'Anglais à Bagdad, comédie-anecdote in 1 act, in prose, mingled with vaudevilles, with Charles-François-Jean-Baptiste Moreau de Commagny, 1812
 La Famille mélomane, comedy in 1 act, mingled with couplets, with de Chazet, 1812
 La Houillière de Beaujonc, ou les Mineurs ensevelis, grand historical tableau vivant, 1812
 Jérusalem déshabillée, parody in un act, in prose and vaudevilles by the opéra de Baour-Lormian, with Commagny and Emmanuel Théaulon, 1812
 La Jeunesse de Henri IV ou La Chaumière béarnaise, one-act comedy, mingled with couplets, with Nicolas Brazier and Merle, 1814
 L'Habit de Catinat, ou La Journée de Marseille, one-act comedy, mingled with couplets, with Merle, 1814
 La Batelière du Loiret, one-act comedy, mingled with vaudevilles, with René de Chazet, 1815
 Malesherbes à St-Denis, poème élégiaque, 1815
 La fille grenadier, one-act comedy, with Merle, 1816
 Poèmes, poésies fugitives, romances, chansons, 1817
 Soirées dramatiques de Jérôme le porteur d'eau, 1817
 Épître au Roi, 1818
 La Leçon d'amour, ou le Rival complaisant, one-act comedy, in prose, mingled with vaudevilles, with Merle, 1818
 La France délivrée, ode, 1818
 La Maison de Pantin, one-act comedy, mingled with couplets, with Merle, 1818
 Et nous aussi nous chantons les vêpres, ou Fanfan Laqueue aux Vêpres siciliennes by Casimir Delavigne, 1820
 Pierre, Paul et Jean, comédie-vaudeville in 2 acts, with Charles-Augustin Sewrin, 1821
 Monsieur Blaise, ou les Deux Châteaux, two-act comedy, mingled with vaudevilles, with Sewrin, 1821
 La Peste de Barcelonne ou le Dévouement français, poem, 1821
 La Morale du Vaudeville, chansonnier à l'usage des enfants et jeunes gens des deux sexes, 1822
 Thompson et Garrick, ou l'Auteur et l'acteur, comedy in 1 act and in verses, mingled with vaudevilles, with Jacquelin, 1822
 Ninette à la Cour, play by Favart, revival with changes, with Armand d'Artois, 1822
 Les mauvaises têtes, one-act comedy, with Sewrin, 1823
 L'Écarté, ou Un lendemain de bal, one-act comedy, mingled with vaudevilles, with de Chazet and Jacques-André Jacquelin, 1822
 Les Funérailles de Louis XVIII, stances, 1824
 Le nouveau caveau pour 1825
 Le Sacre de Charles X, ode, 1825
 Les Bourbons et la France, poems, odes, stances, epistles, etc., followed by the translation in verses of The Rape of the Lock, by Alexander Pope, 1826
 Voltaire à Francfort, anecdotical comedy in 1 act, with Brazier, 1831
 L'Enfance de Boïeldieu, opéra comique and anecdotical in 1 act, 1834
 Conquêtes de l'homme, le puits artésien de Grenelle, poème lyrique, 1841
 Épître à Mlle Mars sur l'annonce de sa retraite, 1841
 Chants et chansons populaires de la France, with Théophile Marion Dumersan, Paul Lacroix and Antoine Le Roux de Lincy, 1843

Bibliography 
 Louis Gabriel Michaud, Biographie universelle ancienne et moderne, 1860, (p. 512) 
 Gustave Vapereau, Dictionnaire universel des littératures, 1884
 Lieven d'Hulst, Cent ans de théorie française de la traduction, 1990, (p. 187)

Honours 
 Croix de la Légion d'honneur (1827)

19th-century French dramatists and playwrights
19th-century French poets
19th-century French journalists
French male journalists
1776 births
1843 deaths
19th-century French male writers